William Pinheiro Rodrigues (January 19, 1989 – 25 February 2018) was a Brazilian football player.

References

External links
 

1989 births
2018 deaths
Brazilian footballers
Brazilian expatriate footballers
Expatriate footballers in Japan
J1 League players
Japan Football League players
Kyoto Sanga FC players
SP Kyoto FC players
Association football midfielders